Vamp is a Brazilian telenovela produced and broadcast at 7:00 PM by TV Globo, from July 15, 1991 to February 8, 1992 in 179 chapters.

In February 2016, the telenovela was released in DVD by Globo Marcas.

Plot 

Armação dos Anjos, on the coast of the state of Rio de Janeiro. The retired captain Jonas Rocha, a widower with six children, married the historian Carmen Maura, also a widow with six children. They will have new problems, beyond those common to a large family, when in contact with the vampires that plague the city with the arrival of the famous singer Natasha to record a music video.

Natasha, a rock singer, has sold her soul to the terrible Count Vladymir Polanski, head of the vampires, to shine in her career. But she finds that she was, in previous incarnations, Eugenia, his love, who preferred to stay with Richardson, the other life of Captain Jonas. The count goes on to pursue Natasha and family of the captain, even using his powers to engage Carmen Maura.

Natasha, in turn, wants to destroy Vlad to get rid of her curse. The only weapon she has for this is the Cross of St. Sebastian, which is hidden somewhere in Armação dos Anjos. The cross must be held by a man named "Rocha" ("Rock"). The hero is thus Captain Jonas.

In Armação dos Anjos there is also Jurandir, who is running from Cachorrão ("Big Dog"), a rich leader of criminals whose house Jurandir robbed by mistake. In the city, he hides in the robes of a priest, befriends the kids and get the nickname Padre Garotão ("Father Young Man"). The gown, however, is not a stumbling block to his mad love affair with Marina, a protégée of Cachorrão.

Cast 

Special participation

See also
Vampire film
List of vampire television series

References

External links

1991 Brazilian television series debuts
1992 Brazilian television series endings
1991 telenovelas
TV Globo telenovelas
Teen telenovelas
Brazilian telenovelas
Portuguese-language telenovelas
Vampires in television
Television series about fictional musicians